The Kists (kist'ebi) are a Chechen subethnos in Georgia. They primarily live in the Pankisi Gorge, in the eastern Georgian region of Kakheti, where there are approximately 9,000 Kist people. The modern Kists are not to be confused with the historical term Kists, an ethnonym of Georgian origin, which was used to refer to the Nakh peoples in the Middle Ages.

Origins
The Kist people's origins can be traced back to their ancestral land in lower Chechnya. In the 1830s and 1870s they migrated to the eastern Georgian Pankisi Gorge and some adjoining lands of the provinces of Tusheti and Kakheti. Named "Kists" (ქისტები) in Georgian, they are closely related culturally, linguistically and ethnically to other Nakh-speaking peoples such as Ingushes and Chechens, but their customs and traditions also share many similarities with the eastern Georgian mountaineers.

Around the same region of Georgia, there is also a related but still different community of Nakh origin called Bats.

In 1886, a total of 2,314 Kists were recorded as living in Georgia. In the Russian Imperial Census of 1897, there were 2,502 Chechens living in Georgia, of which 2,397 lived in the Tionetskiy District (which included the Pankisi Valley). In the Soviet Census of 1939, the number of Chechens living in Georgia was recorded at 2,533 people.

Geographic distribution
Currently there are six Kist villages in Pankisi: Duisi, Dzibakhevi, Jokolo, Shua Khalatsani, Omalo (different from the village of Omalo in Tusheti), and Birkiani. The Kist community remains quite small and are scattered across northeast Georgia, but in the past decade the number of residents in the Pankisi area has at least doubled due to an influx of refugees from neighboring Chechnya.

In 1989, it was calculated that Pankisi was about 43% Kist, 29% Georgian and 28% Ossetian, but many of the Ossetians later fled as a result of the more hostile situation due to the Georgian-Ossetian conflict.

History

The early history of the Kist people is not well known and there are few sources mentioning their traditions, culture and history. The only historical sources available about the ethnic Kists in the area of Pankisi are found in the Georgian press, dated in the 1880s by E. Gugushvili, Zakaria Gulisashvili, Ivane Bukurauli, and Mate Albutashvili (ethnic Kist).

One of the greatest Georgian poets Vazha-Pshavela dedicated his epic Aluda Ketelauri and The Host and the Guest to the story of Kist-Khevsur conflict which occurred in the 18th and 19th centuries. Based on religious and cultural difference, both Caucasian peoples were engaged in fierce fighting. Vazha-Pshavela celebrates heroism of both peoples and underlines the senselessness of their conflict.

During the Second World War, the Kists were the only Chechens in the Soviet Union who were not ethnically cleansed by Stalin in 1944.

During the Second Chechen War, the Kists gave shelter to about 7,000 refugees from Chechnya.

Religion
The majority of Kists adhere to religion made up of syncretized Sunni Muslim beliefs with animistic folk religion. Small pockets of Christian Kists still remain in Pankisi, Tusheti and Kakheti. To this day, the Kists worship the Khevsur sacred places (jvari) and make sacrifices to the Anatori jvari near the Khevsureti village of Shatili, which is located at the Georgian-Chechen border. The Anatori jvari was also considered sacred by Chechens in Maisti and Melkhisti. Highlanders from both the northern Caucasus and Georgia participated together in religious celebrations until the borders were closed. Although today the Kists pray in the mosque in the village of Duisi, they also pray at the sites of old, now-ruined Christian sanctuaries. The Christians among them and some Folk followers pray in Saint George church in the village of Joqolo and attend the religious celebration Alaverdoba in the Alaverdi Monastery of Kakheti. Additionally, Kists celebrate Tetri Giorgoba, a local variation of St George's Day.

When the Kists first arrived in the valley in the early 19th century from Chechnya and Ingushetia, their religious practices included both Islam and their original Nakh religion, with some overlap with the indigenous beliefs of their highland Georgian neighbors. There were also Christian influences. In the latter half of the 19th century, the Russian government pressured the Kists to convert to Orthodox Christianity, and there were various episodes of mass baptisms and church construction. In 1902, Kists who had remained Muslim constructed a mosque in Duisi, but the Russian government refused to recognize it. The Duisi mosque was forcefully closed, along with other religious structures after the Bolshevik revolution, and not reopened until 1960. Sanikidze notes that many Kists, regardless of their designation, have a mix of Muslim, Christian and indigenous religious practices.<ref>Sanikidze. Islamic Resurgence in the Modern Caucasian Region: "Global" and "Local" Islam in the Pankisi Gorge. Page 266-270.</ref>

The position of Islam strengthened among the Kists in the Soviet period, in part because "wandering"
mullahs continued to proselytize and managed to persuade many to convert to Islam, a process that continued into the 1970s. In sum, over the years considerable numbers of Kists became Christian, but most of those who did later reconverted to Islam. Even so, until around 1970, a considerable part of the villagers of Jokolo, Omalo, and Birkiani were Christian, and a Christian chapel was built in Omalo in the 1960s. In the 1970s, however, many Christians in Jokolo and Omalo returned to the Islamic faith. Only Birkiani has a majority Christian population today. Birkiani has two mosques as of 2022. There is also a small community of Kists in Kakheti (a region of Georgia bordering on the Gorge), mainly in the city of Telavi, who consider themselves Orthodox Christians.

Traditions

The Kists remained faithful to their family traditions and customs. To this day, they identify themselves as Chechen, and for official purposes declare themselves of Georgian nationality. They are typically bilingual in Chechen and Georgian.

The Kists represent the majority of the population in all Kist villages of the Pankisi Gorge, with the exception of a few Georgian families. In the Northern Caucasus, the Chechens and to a certain extent the Ingush officially registered father's names as family names. The Kists did not follow this practice. Instead, after migrating to Georgia, the Kists started adding the Georgian endings to their patrimonial names, particularly suffix -shvili (meaning "child" in Georgian), or sometimes suffix -dze (which means "son" in Georgian), or still other times the Georgian suffix -uli (indicating "belonging to" or "descended from"). In this manner, Kist family names were established.

A family's guest was treated with great respect. Men, usually the eldest man of the family, would greet the guest. The guest would then be seated in the most honorable place. The guest was not simply the guest of one particular family, but of the whole village and, in some cases, the whole canyon. Even today, this tradition is strictly maintained.

See also
 Vainakh

References

Die Völker des Caucasus nach den Berichten der Reisebeschreiber
Universal Geography, Or, A Description of All the Parts of the World, vol. 1 
Shorena Kurtsikidze & Vakhtang Chikovani, Ethnography and Folklore of the Georgia-Chechnya Border: Images, Customs, Myths & Folk Tales of the Peripheries, Munich: Lincom Europa, 2008.

 References 

 Bibliography 
 

External links

Georgia's Pankisi Gorge: An Ethnographic Survey
Ethnic Groups in Georgia #5 - Kists. The Georgian Times''. April 11, 2008.

Ethnic groups in Georgia (country)
Nakh peoples
Sub-ethnic groups
Peoples of the Caucasus
Muslim communities of the Caucasus